Melitón Albáñez Domínguez is a small village and ejido in Baja California Sur in La Paz Municipality. The village had a population of 2,409 as of 2020.

References

Populated places in Baja California Sur
La Paz Municipality (Baja California Sur)